The 1955 Star World Championship was held in Havana, Cuba in 1955.

Results

References

Star World Championships
1955 in sailing
Sailing competitions in Cuba
1955 in Cuban sport